Josef Hušbauer (born 16 March 1990) is a Czech professional footballer who played as a midfielder for Cypriot Second Division club Ypsonas. A product of the Sparta Prague football academy, Hušbauer represented his country at various age groups before making his international debut for the Czech Republic in 2012.

Club career

Sparta Prague
Hušbauer started his football career at Sparta Prague. He made his first league appearances in the 2007–08 Czech 2. Liga for Vysočina Jihlava. In 2008, he was sold to FK Viktoria Žižkov, where he spent one season. For the 2009–10 season he was loaned to 1. FK Příbram. In 2010, Hušbauer moved to Baník Ostrava, where he played for one season before being sold to Sparta Prague.

Hušbauer joined Italian side Cagliari on loan in January 2015. However, he only played two matches under manager Gianfranco Zola, and played no further first-team matches after Zola was replaced by Zdeněk Zeman, subsequently cutting his loan period short and returning to Sparta. In the autumn part of the 2015–16 Czech First League, Hušbauer dropped out of the Sparta Prague first team starting eleven and played only two full matches out of 15.

Slavia Prague
Hušbauer signed for Sparta Prague's fierce rivals Slavia Prague in December 2015 for a reported fee of 15 million CZK. On 9 May 2018, he played as Slavia Prague won the 2017–18 Czech Cup final against Jablonec.

In January 2020, Hušbauer joined 2. Bundesliga side Dynamo Dresden on loan until the end of the 2019–20 season. Dresden also secured an option to sign him permanently.

Anorthosis Famagusta
On 24 July 2020, Hušbauer joined Cypriot club Anorthosis Famagusta on a two-year contract until May 2022.

Karmiotissa
In June 2022, Hušbauer joined Cypriot club Karmiotissa.

International career
Hušbauer played for Czech youth national teams from the under-16 level. He made his international debut for the Czech Republic in 2012, his first match being an international friendly against Ukraine, which finished goalless. Hušbauer scored his first international goal in an international friendly match against Finland, which finished 2–2.

Career statistics

Club

International

International goals

Honours

Club
Sparta Prague
 Czech First League: 2013–14
 Czech Cup: 2013–14
 Czech Supercup: 2014

Slavia Prague
 Czech First League: 2016–17
 Czech Cup: 2017–18

Individual
 Czech First League top goalscorer: 2013–14

References

External links
 
 Josef Hušbauer official international statistics

1990 births
Living people
Footballers from Prague
Association football midfielders
Czech footballers
Czech Republic youth international footballers
Czech Republic under-21 international footballers
Czech Republic international footballers
Czech First League players
Serie A players
FC Vysočina Jihlava players
FK Viktoria Žižkov players
1. FK Příbram players
FC Baník Ostrava players
AC Sparta Prague players
SK Slavia Prague players
Cagliari Calcio players
Dynamo Dresden players
Czech expatriate footballers
Expatriate footballers in Italy
Czech expatriate sportspeople in Italy
Expatriate footballers in Germany
Czech expatriate sportspeople in Germany
Anorthosis Famagusta F.C. players
Expatriate footballers in Cyprus
Czech expatriate sportspeople in Cyprus
Karmiotissa FC players